Piletocera reunionalis is a moth of the family Crambidae. It is endemic to La Réunion where it is very common.

It has a wingspan ranging from 9 to 16 mm and is hard to distinguish from Piletocera viperalis. It occurs in different colorations: clear, grey and dark.

References

Moths described in 1957
reunionalis
Lepidoptera of Réunion
Moths of Africa